Bembidion gilvipes is a species of ground beetle native to Europe.

References

gilvipes
Beetles described in 1825
Beetles of Europe